The Men's 800m T52 had its First Round held on September 14 at 18:16 and its Final on September 16 at 10:31.

Medalists

Results

References
Round 1 - Heat 1
Round 1 - Heat 2
Final

Athletics at the 2008 Summer Paralympics